ItAli Airlines S.p.A. was an airline based in Rome. It operated regional scheduled, charter and cargo services, as well as air taxi flights. Its main base was Leonardo da Vinci-Fiumicino International Airport, Rome.

History 

The airline started operations in October 2003 and was wholly owned by Giuseppe Spadaccini. ItAli Airlines connected Pescara airport with the main Italian airports to feed national and international flights and some international destinations, particularly the daily service to Milan-Linate Airport is still operated with Fairchild Swearingen Metroliner.

Line activity, operated with Dornier 328Jet dwindled in favor of charter/ACMI flights, operated with McDonnell Douglas MD-82, mainly from bases at Leonardo da Vinci-Fiumicino Airport and Milan Malpensa Airport.

At the beginning of the Summer 2009 was created the Air Taxi sector of the company on Rome Ciampino Airport with secondary base on Milan-Linate Airport in order to increase Cessna fleet operations. The flights were sold under the brand of MustFly, a subsidiary of ItAli Airlines. MustFly aircraft operated as General aviation under ItAli Airlines Air Operator's Certificate, including two Dornier 328Jet specially reconfigured to 19 seats.

On 21 October 2010, Mr Giuseppe Spadaccini, ItAli Airlines owner, and other 12 people were arrested by Pescara's Guardia di Finanza on suspicion of international tax evasion (around 90 million euros globally).

On 11 March 2011, the Italian Aviation Authority (ENAC) suspended the air operator's certificate due to the persistence of some critical issues from the carrier.

Destinations

During Winter Season 2010, ItAli Airlines served the following scheduled destinations:

Europe

Genoa -Genoa Airport (Key Airport)
Milan - Linate Airport
Reggio Calabria - Reggio Calabria Airport (Key Airport)
Rome - Leonardo Da Vinci International Airport (Hub)

Paris - Charles de Gaulle Airport

Fleet

The ItAli Airlines fleet consisted of the following aircraft at the time of closure:

ItAli Airlines had placed an order for 10 Sukhoi Superjet 100-95 aircraft which were expected to be in service around mid-2010. This order also included 10 options. However, in January 2011, the ItAli's firm order had been dropped from Superjet International's order book.

See also
 List of defunct airlines of Italy

References

External links 

ItAli Airlines

Italian companies established in 2003
Defunct airlines of Italy
Airlines established in 2003
Airlines disestablished in 2011
Italian companies disestablished in 2011